Willendorf an der Schneebergbahn (German, 'Willendorf on the Schneeberg Railway') is a town in the district of Neunkirchen in the Austrian state of Lower Austria.  It is not to be confused with Willendorf in der Wachau where the Venus of Willendorf was discovered.

Population

References

Cities and towns in Neunkirchen District, Austria